Cumberland Farms, colloquially known as Cumby's, is a regional chain of convenience stores based in Westborough, Massachusetts, operating primarily in  New England, New York and Florida. Cumberland Farms operates 566 retail stores, gas stations, and a support system including petroleum and grocery distribution operations in 8 states: Massachusetts, Rhode Island, Maine, New Hampshire, Connecticut, Vermont, New York and Florida.

History 
In 1939, Vasilios and Aphrodite Haseotes purchased a single-cow farm in Cumberland, Rhode Island, which eventually grew into the largest dairy farm in Southern New England. Cumberland Farms opened a dairy store in Bellingham, Massachusetts, in 1958 and the first convenience store in the northeastern United States in 1962.

In the late 1960s Cumberland Farms had a successful ad campaign that helped expand their franchise, in part due to catchy jingles written by Brad Delp, who later co-founded the rock band Boston with Tom Scholz.

On May 2, 1992, Cumberland Farms filed for Chapter 11 bankruptcy.

Cumberland Farms became a two-thirds limited partner in the Gulf Oil company in 1993, having obtained the right to sell gasoline under the Gulf name throughout the United States in 1986. In 2016, Cumberland Farms sold its entire holding in Gulf Oil.

In September 2010, Cumberland Farms sold 61 locations, then in June 2011 closed an additional 29 stores. According to management, these sales and closures were to redeploy capital to their remaining stores and new builds.

In July 2018, Cumberland Farms closed several Florida locations to focus their attention on the state's East Coast.

In the past, Cumberland Farms television ads have featured actor David Hasselhoff.
In spring 2019, Cumberland Farms TV ads began using retired pro wrestling star, "The Nature Boy", Ric Flair.

In April 2019, Cumberland Farms was reported to have retained Bank of America to explore a possible sale of the entire chain.

On July 31, 2019, U.K.-based EG Group announced having entered a binding agreement to purchase Cumberland Farms from the founding Haseotes family.

Corporate image
Its original colors were navy blue and orange, but in 2009, they rebranded with a new logo and colors (navy blue and green).  The new logo change marked the beginning of the transformation of Cumberland Farms stores from older, legacy stores to new AIM stores that now include numerous new fresh food items such as pizza, chicken sandwiches, subs, and a roller grill. Cumberland Farms offers a large assortment of food service items, candy, snacks, and chilled drinks, which it calls "The Chill Zone", along with Cumberland Farms branded chips, pastries, candy, and coffee, etc.

References

External links

 

Companies based in Framingham, Massachusetts
Convenience stores of the United States
Economy of the Eastern United States
Gas stations in the United States
Privately held companies based in Massachusetts
1938 establishments in Massachusetts
Companies that filed for Chapter 11 bankruptcy in 1992
American companies established in 1938
Retail companies established in 1938